Tollhouse (formerly, Toll House) is an unincorporated community in Fresno County, California. It is home to 2,089 people.

The town was created in the 1860s around the Yancy lumber mill. The name "tollhouse" comes from the fact that the community was also built up in connection to a now-defunct toll road running up the steep slopes of Sarver Peak to Pineridge and housed a toll house.

The ZIP Code is 93667, and the community is inside area code 559.

The first post office opened in Tollhouse in 1876, closed in 1884, re-opened in 1885. The last toll on the toll road was collected in 1878.

Nearby small towns include Auberry, Prather, and Shaver.

Tollhouse is the tribal headquarters for the Cold Springs Rancheria of Mono Indians of California.

Notable residents
Notable current and former residents of Tollhouse include:
George Ballis (1925-2010), photographer and activist whose photos documented the efforts of César Chávez and the formation of the United Farm Workers.

See also
 Burrough Valley

References

External links

Unincorporated communities in California
Unincorporated communities in Fresno County, California